Kaleohano, a name meaning the voice (of) authority and respect, is the title of a song written by Louis Moon Kauakahi.  The song has been performed by Israel Kamakawiwoole and by the Mākaha Sons of Niihau.

For the lyrics, and the English translation of the song, please visit reference #2.

Kaleohano, as mentioned above, is a name that means the voice of authority and respect. The song was written as a tribute to Richard Kuakini “Piggy” Kaleohano, a musician and sound man who lived on Hawaiian homestead land in Keaukaha, and was a pillar of the native community there.
Keaukaha means the passing current, and is referring to the homestead land in Hilo, Hawaii.
Mauna Kea means White Mountain and refers to a 13,796' dormant volcano on the island of Hawaii. It is the highest point in the state of Hawai'i.

References

Hawaiian songs